Geordin Gwyn Hill-Lewis (born 31 December 1986) is a South African politician who is the Mayor of Cape Town. A member of the Democratic Alliance, he was elected mayor in November 2021.

Hill-Lewis attended Edgemead High School, obtained an Honours degree in Politics, Philosophy and Economics from UCT, and a Masters in Finance specialising in Economic Policy from London University.

Hill-Lewis served in the National Assembly of South Africa for more than a decade from August 2011 until November 2021. He held multiple positions in the DA's Shadow Cabinet in the National Assembly. He served as the Shadow Deputy Minister of Public Service from August 2011 to February 2012, as the Shadow Deputy Minister of Trade and Industry from February 2012 to June 2014, as the Shadow Minister of Trade and Industry between June 2014 and June 2017, and as the Shadow Minister of Finance from June 2019 until he resigned to become mayor in November 2021.

Early life and education
Hill-Lewis was born in Plettenberg Bay. His family moved to Cape Town when he was a young boy. He was raised by a single mother, who is a nurse. He attended Edgemead High School and holds a Bachelor of Commerce degree as well as an honours degree in politics, philosophy and economics from the University of Cape Town. From the University of London, he obtained a master's degree in economic policy.

Political career
Hill-Lewis became politically active during his high school years. During his studies at the University of Cape Town, he founded the Democratic Alliance Students’ Organization (DASO). He worked as Chief of Staff in the office of former Western Cape Premier Helen Zille.

Parliamentary career (2011–2021)

In August 2011, Hill-Lewis was appointed to the National Assembly, the lower house of parliament, to fill Willem Doman's seat. He was only twenty-four years and seven months old when he took office, which made him the youngest MP in the 4th Parliament (2009–2014). He was appointed Shadow Deputy Minister of Public Service and Administration by parliamentary leader Athol Trollip.

In February 2012, newly elected DA parliamentary leader Lindiwe Mazibuko appointed Hill-Lewis to the shadow cabinet as the Shadow Deputy Minister of Trade and Industry. After the 2014 general election, he was unseated as the youngest MP by Yusuf Cassim, who was also from the DA. Mmusi Maimane made him the Shadow Minister of Trade and Industry in June 2014. Hill-Lewis was removed from the shadow cabinet in June 2017, as he was appointed as chief of staff in Maimane's office.

Following the 2019 general election, Hill-Lewis became the Shadow Minister of Finance in the new shadow cabinet led by Maimane. He remained in the position following the election of John Steenhuisen as DA leader in November 2020. Hill-Lewis resigned from the National Assembly on 9 November 2021 in preparation for his move to the Cape Town city council.

Mayor of Cape Town (2021–present)

Campaign 
On 1 April 2021, Hill-Lewis announced that he had applied to be the DA's mayoral candidate for the City of Cape Town for the local government elections to be held later on in the year. He had been the DA's constituency head in George in the Southern Cape at that time. He was up against incumbent mayor Dan Plato and the DA's provincial leader Bonginkosi Madikizela. Madikizela later resigned as provincial leader and from all active party roles after being caught up in a qualifications scandal. Hill-Lewis was reported to be the frontrunner.

DA leader John Steenhuisen announced on 23 August that Hill-Lewis would be the DA’s mayoral candidate in the 2021 local government elections. Incumbent mayor Plato, who had also applied to be the DA's mayoral candidate, pledged to support Hill-Lewis's campaign. On 29 August 2021, Hill-Lewis launched his campaign to become mayor in Bonteheuwel where he had attended his first DA meeting at ward councillor Theresa Thompson's home in June 2004.

In September 2021, Hill-Lewis wrote to the Minister of Public Works and Infrastructure and former DA mayor, Patricia de Lille, calling on her to cancel the government's lease for the Acacia Park parliamentary village so that the City of Cape Town can buy the land from the government and release it for the development of affordable housing. De Lille responded by calling him "stupid", despite her past support for the proposal. Hill-Lewis then led a demonstration outside the Department of Public Works building and handed over a memorandum. Hill-Lewis has also identified the Air Force Base Ysterplaat and the SAS Wingfield for social housing.

On 7 October 2021, Hill-Lewis announced his seven-point plan to end loadshedding in the City of Cape Town. His plan includes procuring electricity directly from Independent Power Producers and investing in the Steenbras hydroelectric plant.

On 3 November, two days after the municipal elections on 1 November, the DA was projected to retain their majority in the City of Cape Town, winning 58% of the vote, a decline of 8% from the 66% the party achieved in the 2016 municipal elections. Hill-Lewis admitted in an interview with News24 journalist Jan Gerber that the DA performed much better than he expected.

Tenure 
On 18 November 2021, the city council held its inaugural meeting after the election, at which Hill-Lewis was elected and sworn in as mayor. Hill-Lewis was elected mayor with 141 out of 224 votes. The ANC's Noluthando Makasi received 46 votes while the  Cape Independence Party's Jack Miller got only two votes. There were 20 abstentions and 15 spoilt ballots. At age 34, he is the second youngest mayor in the city's history after David Graaff (1891-1892). On his first day in office, he inspected sewage issues in Khayelitsha and Phoenix.

On 22 November, Hill-Lewis announced the formation of his 11-member mayoral committee to turn Cape Town into a "city of hope". Only six councillors out of the previous administration were retained. Long-serving members Ian Neilson, Xanthea Limberg, Marian Nieuwoudt, Phindile Maxiti and Sharon Cottle were not reappointed to the new mayoral committee.

Personal life
Hill-Lewis is married to Carla. They have one child. They reside in Edgemead, one of the northern suburbs of Cape Town. He is an avid rugby union fan.

References

External links

Archived profile at Parliament of South Africa

Living people
1986 births
21st-century South African politicians
Alumni of the University of London
Democratic Alliance (South Africa) politicians
Members of the National Assembly of South Africa
People from Bitou Local Municipality
Politicians from Cape Town
University of Cape Town alumni
White South African people